Alberto Gonçalves da Costa (born 31 December 1980), commonly known as Beto Gonçalves or simply Beto, is a professional footballer who plays as a striker for Liga 1 club Madura United. Born in Brazil, he represented Indonesia at international level.

Club career

Early career 
Beto started his football career at the Sport Club Belém in Belém along. He transferred after one years to Clube Atlético Vila Rica, where he became of his striker position.

Persipura Jayapura 
His first season in Indonesia, he immediately brought his first Indonesian club Persipura Jayapura champions 2008-09 Indonesia Super League. In his first season in Indonesia he scored 7 goals in 14 league matches. In season 2011-12 Indonesia Super League, He returned to Persipura and He also became the top score of the season 2011-12 Indonesia Super League.

Arema
In 2013, Beto signed a year contract with Arema. He made his league debut on 9 January 2013 in a match against Persidafon Dafonsoro. On 9 January 2013, Beto scored his first goal for Arema in the 18th minute at the Kanjuruhan Stadium, Malang.

Sriwijaya 
On 1 February 2016, he returned to Indonesia to strengthen Sriwijaya. He returned to beingthe top score of the season 2016 Indonesia Soccer Championship A and was also in the best starting XI that season too. For 3 seasons defending Sriwijaya, he scored 58 goals in 88 appearances and  carry Sriwijaya won the pre-season competition 2018 East Kalimantan Governor Cup. On 25 August 2020, he returned to Sriwijaya with loan status from Madura United.

Madura United 
On 20 February 2019, he officially joined Madura United from Sriwijaya. On 17 May 2019, he made his debut for the club, scoring two goals and providing Greg Nwokolo with an assist in a 5–1 victory against Persela.

Return to Sriwijaya (loan)
He was signed for Sriwijaya to play in the Liga 2 in the 2020 season, on loan from Madura United. This season was suspended on 27 March 2020 due to the COVID-19 pandemic. The season was abandoned and was declared void on 20 January 2021.

Persis Solo (loan) 
On 26 April 2021, Beto signed for Indonesian Liga 2 club Persis Solo, on loan from Liga 1 club Madura United. He made his league debut on 26 September by starting in a 2–0 win against PSG Pati, and he also scored his first goal for Persis in the 20th minute at the Manahan Stadium, Surakarta.

International career 
He made his debut with Indonesia on 10 October 2018 in a friendly against Myanmar in which he scored a goal and also immediately provide 1 assist. On 15 June 2019, he scored four goals against Vanuatu in which Indonesia won 6–0. He was also included to the Indonesia Olympic squad as one of the senior players at the 2018 Asian Games. He also scored 4 goals in 5 appearances.

Career statistics

Club

International appearances

International goals 

 Scores and results list the Indonesia's goal tally first.

Honours

Club
Persipura Jayapura
 Indonesia Super League: 2008–09
 Indonesian Community Shield: 2009

Arema
 East Java Governor Cup: 2013
 Menpora Cup: 2013

Sriwijaya
 East Kalimantan Governor Cup: 2018

Persis Solo
 Liga 2: 2021

Individual
 Copa Indonesia Top Goalscorer: 2007–08
Indonesia Super League Top Goalscorer: 2011–12
 Indonesia Soccer Championship A Top Goalscorer: 2016
 Indonesia Soccer Championship A Best XI: 2016
 East Kalimantan Governor Cup Top Goalscorer: 2018
 Liga 1 Team of the Season: 2019 (Substitutes)
 Indonesian Soccer Awards: Best 11 2019
 Liga 2 Top Goalscorer: 2021
 Liga 2 Best XI: 2021

References

External links 
 
 

1980 births
Living people
Sportspeople from Belém
Indonesian footballers
Indonesia international footballers
Brazilian footballers
Brazilian emigrants to Indonesia
Indonesian people of Brazilian descent
I-League players
Liga 1 (Indonesia) players
Indonesian Super League-winning players
Indonesian Premier Division players
SVB Eerste Divisie players
Malaysia Premier League players
Liga 2 (Indonesia) players
Persijap Jepara players
Persipura Jayapura players
Dempo SC players
Arema F.C. players
Penang F.C. players
Sriwijaya F.C. players
Persija Jakarta players
Madura United F.C. players
Persis Solo players
Brazilian expatriate footballers
Expatriate footballers in India
Expatriate footballers in Suriname
Expatriate footballers in Indonesia
Expatriate footballers in Malaysia
Brazilian expatriate sportspeople in India
Brazilian expatriate sportspeople in Indonesia
Brazilian expatriate sportspeople in Suriname
Brazilian expatriate sportspeople in Malaysia
Naturalised citizens of Indonesia
Association football forwards
Footballers at the 2018 Asian Games
Asian Games competitors for Indonesia